Corinna Helen Folkins née MacDonald (1918-1998), was a United States international lawn bowler.

Bowls career

World Championships
Folkins won a bronze medal at the 1977 World Outdoor Bowls Championship in Worthing, in the triples event with Dorothy Bacon and Louise Godfrey.

National
Folkins was the 1981 pairs national champion  and the Southwest Division American Women's Lawn Bowls Association (AWLBA) president while bowling for the Casta del Sol Bowls Club.

Personal life
She married fellow international bowler Dick Folkins in 1947.

References

American female bowls players
1918 births
1998 deaths
20th-century American women
20th-century American people